Quartzburg may refer to:
Quartzburg, former name of Nashville, California
Quartzburg, Kern County, California
Quartzburg, Mariposa County, California
Quartzburg, Idaho